Dovercourt railway station is on the Mayflower Line, a branch of the Great Eastern Main Line, in the East of England, serving the seaside town of Dovercourt, Essex. Its three-letter station code is DVC.

The station is currently operated by Abellio Greater Anglia, which also runs all trains serving the station.

History
The station was opened by the Eastern Union Railway on 15 August 1854 and was originally named Dovercourt. Its name was changed to Dovercourt Bay on 1 May 1913, but reverted to Dovercourt on 14 December 1972.

Today passenger operations are confined to a bi-directional single electrified track, using what was the "up" track in the days when services through the station were operated on both tracks by steam and diesel locomotives. The unnumbered platform has an operational length for eight-coach trains. The remains of what was the "down" platform survive. The down platform also had a rather sizeable canopy, which was of little benefit given that most use of the platform was by passengers arriving. The bridge which linked the two platforms has since been removed. The only station beyond Dovercourt on the down side is Harwich Town, which is a relatively short walking distance. The station also had a signal box which was positioned at the west (London) end of the down platform; it controlled the occasional goods movements to short sidings at both ends of the up platform, which were used for coal and other goods deliveries to the town.

Services
 the typical weekday off-peak service on the line is one train per hour in each direction, although some additional services run at peak times.

References

Railway stations in Essex
DfT Category E stations
Railway stations in Great Britain opened in 1854
Former Great Eastern Railway stations
Greater Anglia franchise railway stations
Harwich